Sweeten is a surname. Notable people with the surname include:

 Madylin Sweeten (born 1991), American actress
 Mark Sweeten Wade (1858–1929), medical doctor and historian
 Sawyer Sweeten (1995–2015), American actor, brother of Madylin